William Porter was a Scottish professional football centre half who made over 120 appearances in the Scottish League for Raith Rovers. He also played senior football for Heart of Midlothian, Ayr United, St Mirren and in the United States.

Personal life 
Porter served in McCrae's Battalion of the Royal Scots during the First World War.

Honours 
Philadelphia
 American Soccer League: 1921–22

Career statistics

References 

Scottish footballers
Royal Scots soldiers
Scottish Football League players
Association football wing halves
Raith Rovers F.C. players
McCrae's Battalion
Kirkintilloch Rob Roy F.C. players
Place of birth missing
British Army personnel of World War I
Year of birth missing
Year of death missing
Place of death missing
Armadale F.C. players
St Mirren F.C. players
Ayr United F.C. players
Heart of Midlothian F.C. players
Philadelphia Field Club players
Weymouth F.C. players
Scottish expatriate footballers
Expatriate soccer players in the United States
American Soccer League (1921–1933) players
Scottish expatriate sportspeople in the United States